The F-class escort ships were a class of fleet escorts used by the German Navy (Kriegsmarine)  during the Second World War. Ten ships were built in total to fulfil a multi-purpose role. They were the only ships of this type of built by the Kriegsmarine. The ships were not given names, but were designated F1 through F10.

Construction
The ships were built by Germaniawerft (F 1 – F 6), Kiel, Blohm & Voss (F 7, F 8) and Wilhelmshaven dockyard (F 9, F 10). They entered service between 1936 and 1939. Similar in size to the Type 35 and Type 37 torpedo-boats, the ships were originally conceived as fast fleet or convoy escort ships that could also perform anti-submarine and minesweeping work. They were also used as a testbed class for a new high-pressure steam power plant intended for use in future destroyers.

As a class, they were overloaded and over-engined, which contributed to severe hull stress and very poor sea-keeping characteristics; these flaws were partially remedied by extensive rebuilds between 1938 and 1940. The power plants likewise proved to be prone to frequent breakdowns, and most of the ships were removed from operational service during the later years of the war after machinery failures meant the ships spent more time in repair than in use.

Use and administration
With the exception of fleet service and convoy duties between 1939 and 1941, they spent most of the war in use as tenders or U-boat training ships.  Between 1943 and 1945, the escort ships were grouped into five escort flotillas augmented by converted civilian craft as well as torpedo boats of the Torpedoboot Ausland program.

Ships

F 5 was damaged by a mine in the Baltic Sea and sank under tow 29 January 1945. F 3 was sunk by British aircraft 3 May 1945 and F 6 was sunk by US aircraft 30 March 1945. One is also believed to be the craft sunk in Tobruk Harbour by Native Military Corps Lance Corporal Job Maseko on July 21 1942, as a POW consigned to work as stevedore by the occupying Axis forces, for which he was eventually awarded the Military Medal. The others survived the war and were scrapped or sunk as target ships.

References

Bibliography

External links

 page from german-navy.de

World War II naval ships of Germany